Elections for London Borough of Redbridge Council were held on Thursday 4 May 2006. The whole council was up for election. Redbridge is divided into 21 wards, each electing 3 councilors, so a total of 63 seats were up for election.

Election results

Ward results

Aldborough

Barkingside

Bridge

Chadwell

Church End

Clayhall

Clementswood

Cranbrook

Fairlop

Fullwell

Goodmayes

Hainault

Loxford

Mayfield

Monkhams

Newbury

Roding

Seven Kings

Snaresbrook

Valentines

Wanstead

See also
2006 United Kingdom local elections

References

2006
2006 London Borough council elections